Pedro de Atarés ( in Borja – 21 February 1151) was a Spanish noble and member of the House of Aragón. He founded the Veruela Abbey, the oldest Cistercian monastery in Aragon.

Biography

Family
Pedro de Atarés was the son of García Sánchez, Lord of Aibar, Atarés, and Javierrelatre, and grandson of Sancho Ramírez, Count of Ribagorza, an illegitimate child of King Ramiro I.  His mother was Teresa Cajal, a sister of Fortún Garcés Cajal, one of the most powerful magnates in the Kingdom of Aragón.

Pretender to the throne 
Pedro inherited the lordships of Atarés and Javierrelatre from his father, and received Borja by gift of King Alfonso VII of Castile,  He was one of the claimants to the throne of Aragón after the childless death of King Alfonso I the Battler. According to the Crónica de San Juan de la Peña, written in the 14th century, he had been the preferred candidate of the Aranonese barons but he then alienated them with his haughty behavior at the assembly, and they instead chose the deceased king's brother Ramiro II, until then a monk.

Founder of Veruela Abbey 

In 1146, Pedro de Atarés founded Veruela Abbey (Real Monasterio de Santa María de Veruela), the most ancient Cistercian monastery in Aragon, with a donation, also confirmed by his mother, to the abbot of the Escaladieu Abbey
in France. This donation was later confirmed in 1155 by Count Raymond Berenguer IV.

Death without issue 
Pedro de Atarés died on 21 February 1151 and was buried at the abbey which he had founded. Although he died without leaving any children, members of the House of Borgia invented a genealogy tracing their origins back to this member of the royal house coinciding with the third wedding of Lucrezia Borgia to Alfonso I d'Este, Duke of Ferrara, which was arranged by her father Pope Alexander VI. Nevertheless:

Family tree

Notes

References

Bibliography

External links 
Real Monasterio de Santa María de Veruela in Vera de Moncayo 
Monasterio de Veruela

1080s births
1151 deaths
Pedro
12th-century people from the Kingdom of Aragon